Ningyuan County is a county of Hunan Province, China, it is under the administration of Yongzhou prefecture-level City.

Located on the southern part of the province, the county is bordered to the north by Qiyang County, to the northeast by Xintian County, to the east by Jiahe County, to the southeast by Lanshan County, to the southwest by Jianghua and Dao Counties, to the northwest by Shuangpai County. The county has 12 towns, four ethnic townships of Yao people and four subdistricts under its jurisdiction, the county seat is Shunling.

Administrative Divisions

Climate

References
www.xzqh.org

External links 

 
County-level divisions of Hunan
Yongzhou